K. Gopinath (born 19 November 1962) is an Indian politician and was elected in 2011 as a member of the Tamil Nadu Legislative Assembly from Hosur constituency. As a candidate of Indian National Congress, he was previously elected to the Assembly from the Hosur constituency in the 2001 and 2006 elections.

He lost the Hosur seat to P. Balakrishna Reddy of the All India Anna Dravida Munnetra Kazhagam in the 2016 elections.

Childhood 
Gopinath was born in Hosur, Krishnagiri district, on 19 November 1962. He is married.

References 

Tamil Nadu MLAs 2006–2011
Tamil Nadu MLAs 2011–2016
Indian National Congress politicians from Tamil Nadu
Living people
People from Krishnagiri district
1962 births
Tamil Nadu MLAs 2001–2006